Double Crossing is a Hardy Boys and Nancy Drew crossover novel.

Double Crossing may also refer to:
Double Crossing, a 2001 Hong Kong film with Deric Wan
Double Crossing, a 1983 novel by Erika Holzer
Double Crossing: New and Selected Poems by Eva Salzman 2004

See also
Double Cross (disambiguation)
"Double Crossing Blues," a 1950 song